Drew Esocoff (born c. 1957) is an American television sports director, who as of 2006 has been the director of NBC Sunday Night Football.

Early life
Esocoff was born in Elizabeth, New Jersey, graduating from Thomas Jefferson High School in 1975, later attending Colgate University. While in college he worked as a substitute teacher at Elizabeth High School where one of his students was Todd Bowles.

Career
Esocoff has worked for ESPN and ABC, serving as director for Monday Night Football, SportsCenter, and the NBA Finals, as well as five Super Bowls. Since 2006, he has served as director for NBC Sunday Night Football.

As of 2015, Esocoff has won 11 Emmy Awards.

References

Living people
People from Elizabeth, New Jersey
Thomas Jefferson High School (New Jersey) alumni
Colgate University alumni
Year of birth missing (living people)